Maryevka is a rural locality (a village) in Zyak-Ishmetovsky Selsoviet, Kuyurgazinsky District, Bashkortostan, Russia. The population was 245 as of 2010. There are 3 streets.

Geography 
Maryevka is located 53 km northwest of Yermolayevo (the district's administrative centre) by road. Zyak-Ishmetovo is the nearest rural locality.

References 

Rural localities in Kuyurgazinsky District